Ayshan Abdulazimova (born 11 April 1993) is an Azerbaijani volleyball middle-blocker who current plays for Vasas Obuda in the Hungarian Women's League. Ayshan also plays for Azerbaijan women's national volleyball team since 2011, becoming the team captain in January 2020.

Awards

Club
 2008–09 Azerbaijan Women's Volleyball Super League -  Runner-Up, with Azerrail Baku
 2009–10 Azerbaijan Women's Volleyball Super League -  Runner-Up, with Lokomotiv Baku
 2011–12 Azerbaijan Women's Volleyball Super League -  Runner-Up, with Azerrail Baku

References

External links
 

1993 births
Living people
Azerbaijani women's volleyball players
Lokomotiv Baku volleyball players
People from Shaki, Azerbaijan
Sportspeople from Baku
European Games competitors for Azerbaijan
Volleyball players at the 2015 European Games
Middle blockers
21st-century Azerbaijani women